Triloki Nath Madan (born 12 August 1933, in Kashmir, India) is an anthropologist, with a Ph.D from the Australian National University (1960). He is currently Professor Emeritus of Sociology at the Institute of Economic Growth, Delhi University, and Distinguished Senior Fellow (Adjunct), Centre for the Study of Developing Societies, Delhi. Of the teaching positions he held earlier, those at Lucknow and Dharwar lasted longest. He taught for short periods at several universities in India and abroad.

He was elected a Fellow of the Royal Anthropological Institute of Great Britain and Ireland in 1989. In 1994, he was made Docteur Honoris Causa by the University of Paris X (Nanterre). In 1995, he occupied the Sarvepalli Radhakrishnan Chair in Humanities and Social Sciences at the University of Hyderabad. 

He has held visiting appointments at a number of universities including Harvard where he was Visiting Professor of Anthropology and of the History of Religion in 1984-85. The Indian Sociological Society gave him the Lifetime Achievement Award in 2008. 

His most noted work is Family and Kinship among the Pandits of Rural Kashmir (1966, 1989) which presented an account of the social life of Kashmiri Pandits. His more recent publications include,"Modern Myths, Locked Minds: Secularism and Fundamentalism in India" (1997, 2009), "Images of the World: Essays on Religion, Secularism, and Culture" (2005), and "Sociological Traditions: Methods and Perspectives in the Sociology of India" (2011).

He was presented with a Festschrift titled Tradition, Pluralism and Identity: In Honour of T.N. Madan, edited by Veena Das, Dipankar Gupta and Patricia Uberoi. Currently he lives in Delhi.

He was married to Uma Chaturvedi, who died in December 2013. They have two children.

References

1933 births
Living people
Indian anthropologists
Academic staff of Delhi University
University of Lucknow alumni
Australian National University alumni
Indian social sciences writers
20th-century Indian non-fiction writers
20th-century Indian social scientists
21st-century Indian social scientists
Scholars from Jammu and Kashmir